Arogalea cristifasciella, the stripe-backed moth, is a moth of the family Gelechiidae. It is found in North America, where it has been recorded from Alabama, Arkansas, Connecticut, Florida, Georgia, Illinois, Indiana, Kansas, Kentucky, Louisiana, Maine, Maryland, Massachusetts, Michigan, Mississippi, Missouri, New Hampshire, New Jersey, New York, North Carolina, Ohio, Oklahoma, Ontario, Quebec, South Carolina, Tennessee, Texas, Virginia, West Virginia and Wisconsin.

The length of the forewings is about 5 mm. The forewings are white with a broad black antemedial band. Adults have been recorded on wing from January to August.

References

Moths described in 1878
Arogalea
Moths of North America